Orbit (foaled 1885) was a Thoroughbred racehorse. He was trained at Kingsclere by John Porter for the 1st Duke of Westminster. As a three-year-old he won the Eclipse Stakes.

Breeding
Orbit was the son of Epsom Derby and Champion Stakes winner Bend Or. His dam was Fair Alice, a daughter of July Stakes winner Cambuscan.

Racing career
Orbit won three races as a two-year-old; the Criterion Nursery Handicap at Newmarket, the Kempton Park Champion Nursery Handicap and the Daveridge Stakes. Orbit started his three-year-old career by winning the Craven Stakes at Newmarket by ¾ length from Cotillon. His next race came in the 2000 Guineas at Newmarket. Friar's Balsam started as the 1/3 favourite for the race, with Ayrshire at 100/12 and Orbit at 100/8. Orbit ran on well in the closing stages to finish in third place. Ayrshire won the race by two lengths from Johnny Morgan, who was a head in front of Orbit. After winning the 2000 Guineas win Ayrshire started as the 5/6 favourite for The Derby and Orbit was second favourite at 11/2. Orbit could only finish in fifth place, over seven lengths behind winner Ayrshire. He then finished second in the Triennial Stakes at Ascot. Orbit started as the 9/4 favourite for the Eclipse Stakes and in the final 100 yards of the race Orbit gradually edged away from stablemate Ossory and beat him by a length.

Stud career
After retiring from racing Orbit was exported to Argentina to stand at stud. He was a successful stallion there and his progeny included Olascoaga and Old Man, who won 18 of his 19 races. Such was his success at stud he was given the nickname "Stockwell Sudamericano" meaning "South American Stockwell" and referring to the British sire Stockwell.

Pedigree

Note: b. = Bay, br. = Brown, ch. = Chestnut

* Orbit was inbred 4x4 to Alice Hawthorn. This means that the mare appears twice in the fourth generation of his pedigree.

References

1885 racehorse births
Racehorses bred in the United Kingdom
Racehorses trained in the United Kingdom
Thoroughbred family 4-k